Wayne van der Bank (born ) is a South African rugby union player for the New England Free Jacks in Major League Rugby (MLR) in the United States. His regular position is centre.

References

South African rugby union players
Living people
1997 births
Rugby union players from Pretoria
Rugby union centres
Golden Lions players
Pumas (Currie Cup) players
New England Free Jacks players